Lythria cruentaria is a moth of the family Geometridae. The species can be found in Europe.

The length of the forewings is 9–13 mm. The moths fly in two or three generations from the end of April to the end of September. .

The caterpillars feed on sorrel and sheep's sorrel.

Notes
The flight season refers to the Belgium and the Netherlands. This may vary in other parts of the range.

External links

Lepiforum.de
Vlindernet.nl 

Lythriini
Moths of Europe
Moths of Asia
Taxa named by Johann Siegfried Hufnagel